Billy is an American sitcom that aired on CBS from February 26 to April 28, 1979. The series was based on Keith Waterhouse and Willis Hall's 1960 British play Billy Liar and their 1973-74 TV series of the same name.

Synopsis
Billy stars Steve Guttenberg as Billy Fisher, a mortician's clerk with a tendency to daydream. His Walter Mitty-like tendency would have him imagining that he was a famous surgeon, a rock superstar, a disk jockey, a television network executive, or a football star.  Each episode of Billy had at least two of his fantasies, which included appearances by Don Adams, Suzanne Somers, Larry Csonka, Merv Griffin, and Lou Ferrigno.

Peggy Pope and James Gallery portray Billy's often-frustrated parents (she thought Billy had a vivid imagination; he viewed Billy as a chronic, compulsive liar). Paula Trueman played his grandmother, who believed that Billy was insane, Bruce Talkington played Billy's friend Arthur Milliken, a fellow worker at Shadrack and Shadrack funeral home and Michael Alaimo as Billy's employer.

Reception
Billy replaced Co-Ed Fever in CBS' Monday night lineup during February 1979, when the latter series was cancelled after one episode. Billy did only slightly better and was cancelled two months later, its last episode broadcast by CBS on April 28, 1979. It ranked 76th out of 114 shows that season, with an average 15.0/24 rating/share.

Episode list

References

External links 
 

1979 American television series debuts
1979 American television series endings
1970s American sitcoms
American television series based on British television series
CBS original programming
English-language television shows
Television series by 20th Century Fox Television
Television shows about death
Television shows set in New York City